St. Pancras South was a borough constituency represented in the House of Commons of the Parliament of the United Kingdom. It elected one Member of Parliament (MP) by the first-past-the-post system of election. It was created by the Redistribution of Seats Act 1885 for the 1885 general election and abolished for the 1918 general election.

Boundaries

Members of Parliament

Elections

Elections in the 1880s

Elections in the 1890s 

Goldsmid's death prompted a by-election.

Elections in the 1900s

Elections in the 1910s 

General Election 1914–15:

Another General Election was required to take place before the end of 1915. The political parties had been making preparations for an election to take place and by the July 1914, the following candidates had been selected; 
Unionist: Herbert Jessel
Liberal: Florance Montefiore Guedalla

References 
Notes

Bibliography
 

Parliamentary constituencies in London (historic)
Constituencies of the Parliament of the United Kingdom established in 1885
Constituencies of the Parliament of the United Kingdom disestablished in 1918
Politics of the London Borough of Camden